Salome (c. early 1st century CE) was the daughter of Herodias, and nemesis of John the Baptist (Mark 6:17–29 and Matthew 14:3–11).

Salome or Salomé may also refer to:

People with the mononym

 Salome Alexandra (139–67 BCE), Queen of Judea (76–67 BCE)
 Salome I (69 BCE–10 CE), Herod the Great's sister
 Salome (daughter of Herod the Great) (14 BCE–1st century CE), daughter of Herod the Great
 Salome (disciple) (c. early 1st century CE), disciple of Jesus
 Salome, the first wife of Joseph, father of Jesus in Eastern Orthodox Church tradition
 Salome (Gospel of James), midwife's friend in an apocryphal Nativity gospel who doubted Mary's virginity
 Salome of Ujarma (died about 361), daughter of Tiridates III of Armenia and wife of Rev II of Iberia; also known as Salome of Armenia
 Salomé (singer) (born 1939), Spanish singer
 Salomé (artist) (born 1954), German artist
 Salome MC (born 1985), Iranian/Turkish MC

People with the given name
 Salome (given name), a list of people with this given name

People with the surname
 Théodore Salomé (1834–1896), French organist and composer
 Lou Andreas-Salomé (1861–1937), Russian-born psychoanalyst and writer
 Greta Salóme (born 1986), Icelandic singer and violinist

Places
 Salome, Arizona, a census-designated place in La Paz County, Arizona, United States
 Salomé, Nord,  a commune in northern France

Arts, entertainment, and media

Fictional entities
 Salome, the main character in Tom Robbins' novel, Skinny Legs and All
 Salome, a fictional West Texas town in Tin Cup
 Salome Agrippa, in the TV series True Blood

Film and television
 Salomè (1910 film), Italian film by Ugo Falena
 Salomé (1918 film), a film starring Theda Bara
 Salomé (1923 film), American silent film
 Salome, Where She Danced, a 1945 American film
 Salome (1953 film), American film starring Rita Hayworth
 Salome (1968 film), an Australian television play
 Salome (1972 film), an Italian film, directed by Carmelo Bene
 Salome (1973 film), a short horror film by Clive Barker
 Salomè (1986 film), Italian film
 Salomé (TV series) (2001–2002), a Mexican telenovela starring Edith González
 Salomé (2002 film), Spanish film by Carlos Saura
 Wilde Salomé (2011) American documentary-drama film directed by Al Pacino
 Salomé (2013 film), American film by Al Pacino

Literature
 "Salome", a poem by Carol Ann Duffy, featured in The World's Wife (1999)
 Salome: The Wandering Jewess, a 1930 novel by George Sylvester Viereck and Paul Eldridge

Music

Albums
 Salomè (album), a 1981 album by Mina
 Salome (Marriages album)
 Salomé – The Seventh Veil, a 2007 album by Xandria, which also features the song "Salomé"

Songs
 "Salomé" (song), a 1999 song written by Chayanne
 "Salome", a song in the 1943 film Du Barry Was a Lady
 "Salome", a song by The House of Love from The House of Love
 "Salomé", a 1990 song by U2 included in the 1992 single "Even Better Than the Real Thing"
 "Salome", a 2000 song by Alcazar from Casino
 "Salome", a 1997 song by Lili Haydn from Lili
 "Salome", a song by the Old 97s from Too Far to Care
 "Salome", a 2012 song by Kaya
 "Salome", a 2004 song by Stormwitch from Witchcraft
 "Salomé", a 1979 song written by Jean-Patrick Capdevielle

Piano
 "Salomé", 1909, one of Mel Bonis' Femme de Légende

Stage works
 Salome (play), an 1893 play by Oscar Wilde
 Salome (opera), a 1905 German opera by Richard Strauss based on Wilde's play
 Vision of Salomé, a 1906 interpretation of Oscar Wilde's play, produced by Maud Allan
 , a 1907 ballet by Florent Schmitt
 Salomé (Mariotte), a 1908 French opera by Antoine Mariotte based on Wilde's play
 Salome, a 1978 ballet in two acts by Peter Maxwell Davies with choreography by Flemming Flindt

Visual arts
 Salome, a c. 1510–1530 painting by Giampietrino
 Salome, a 1512–1516 painting by Alonso Berruguete
 Salome (Titian, Rome), a c. 1515 oil painting by Titian
 Salome (Titian, Madrid), a c. 1550 oil painting by Titian
 Salome (Titian, private collection), a c. 1570 oil painting by Titian
 Salome, a c. 1530 painting by Lucas Cranach the Elder
 Salomé (Moretto), a 1540 oil painting by Moretto da Brescia
 Salome, a 1615–1620 painting by Giovanni Battista Caracciolo 
 Salome, an 1870 painting by Henri Regnault
 Salome (Stuck), a 1906 painting by Franz von Stuck
 Salome, a 1909 painting by Robert Henri
 Salome with the Head of John the Baptist (disambiguation)

Other uses
 Salome (software), an open-source software for numerical simulation

See also
 Sainte-Marie-Salomé, Quebec, a parish municipality in Québec, Canada
 Salomey, a cartoon pig
 Shalom (disambiguation)
 Salam (disambiguation)
 Salma (disambiguation)

French masculine given names
Portuguese masculine given names
Spanish masculine given names